The Bristol Blitz was the heavy bombing of Bristol, England by the Nazi German Luftwaffe during the Second World War. Due to the presence of Bristol Harbour and the Bristol Aeroplane Company, the city was a target for bombing and was easily found as enemy bombers were able to trace a course up the River Avon from Avonmouth using reflected moonlight on the waters into the heart of the city. Bristol was the fifth-most heavily-bombed British city of the war.

Between 24 November 1940 and 11 April 1941 there were six major bombing raids. In total Bristol received 548 air raid alerts and 77 air raids with:
 919 tons of high-explosive bombs plus many thousands of incendiary bombs dropped in clusters
 1,299 people killed, 1,303 seriously injured and 697 rescued from the debris of bombed buildings
 89,080 buildings damaged including 81,830 houses destroyed and over 3,000 rendered unusable and later demolished.

First raids
In a night raid on 2 November 1940, 5,000 incendiary and 10,000 high explosive bombs were dropped on the old city.

On 24 November 148 Luftflotte 3 bombers left Germany to bomb Bristol. The attack started at 6.30pm, with waves of two or three bombers passing over Bristol dropping around 12,000 incendiary bombs and 160 tons of high-explosive bombs; within an hour over 70 fires had started. Park Street was "smashed" and the Bristol Museum hit, 207 people were killed and thousands of houses were destroyed or damaged. The area that is now Castle Park was extensively damaged. The Jacobean St Peter's Hospital was destroyed, and the 17th century timber-framed Dutch House was damaged and subsequently demolished. Four of Bristol's ancient churches (St Peter's, the interior of St Nicholas, St Mary-le-Port and Temple Church) were also badly damaged. The St James' Presbyterian Church of England, Bristol was gutted.

The Lord Mayor of Bristol, Alderman Thomas Underwood, described the effect of the raids as "The City of Churches had in one night become the city of ruins."

On 7 December 1940, bombs hit the Bristol–Salisbury train "killing several passengers including a number of soldiers."

Following raids
On 3 – 4 January 1941 Bristol had its longest raid, lasting 12 hours; during which the Luftwaffe dropped their biggest bomb on the city. It did not explode, and was recovered in April 1943. The bomb disposal crew had to dig down  to get to it. The bomb was later paraded through the streets of London during the VE Day Victory Parade.

Bristol Good Friday air raids

The infamous Good Friday air raids caused further damage to the centre of the city, Knowle, Hotwells, Cotham and Filton, and caused the permanent closure of the Bristol Tramways. Winston Churchill visited the ruins on 12 April 1941. The last air raid of the Blitz on Bristol was on 25 April 1941, when Brislington, Bedminster and Knowle were bombed. It is speculated that these suburbs were not the targets themselves but that bombs intended for Filton's manufacturing areas were mistakenly dropped on other areas.

One of the common types of bomb dropped on the city was a canister containing many incendiaries (locally known as Goering's Bread Basket – from the Molotov bread basket device); these caused numerous fires and were designed to cause panic amongst the citizens, and stretch the fire services to their limits.

The last raid on Bristol was on 15 May 1944.

Bristol was in danger of being hit by V-1 flying bombs, and by the A4/V2 rockets, whose launching platforms had already been built on the Cotentin peninsula in France in 1944. However, the Allied invasion of Normandy on 6 June 1944 saw these launching platforms on Cotentin being quickly overrun and consequently no V1 or V2s landed on Bristol.

Decoy sites

In the early years of the Second World War following the bombing of Coventry in November 1940, many decoy sites were built with the intention of drawing enemy bombing raids away from the major cities. A smaller one was in the parish of Chew Magna. These were known as starfish sites, and were designed to simulate Bristol under blackout conditions, even to the extent of mimicking the flickering lights of railway marshalling yards. In the event of an imminent air raid, beacons were lit at the decoy sites.

References

 An online archive of wartime memories contributed by members of the public and gathered by the BBC.

External links

 Bristol Blitzed
 Bristol Blitz timeline (with photos)
 Bristol Blitz timeline (very detailed timeline, with Avonmouth, Portishead, Weston super Mare, Filton, Yate incl., with technical details a.o.)
 Extracts from the Western Daily press 1940–1944
 Bibliography and Resources: Bristol at War
 Extracts from English Heritage's Record of Scheduled Monuments
 A documentary about the Bristol Blitz and its effect on Castle Park

Military history of Bristol
The Blitz
Firebombings
1940s in Bristol